The Godfather Game is a board game published by Family Games, Inc., in 1971.

Gameplay
The Godfather Game is an economic card game about the mafia.

Reviews
Games & Puzzles
Moves(p18)

References

External links
 

Board games introduced in 1971